The Mauritius bulbul (Hypsipetes olivaceus), is a songbird belonging to the bulbul family, Pycnonotidae. It is endemic to Mauritius.

Taxonomy and systematics
The Mauritius bulbul was the type species of the obsolete genus Ixocincla, which united various more or less closely related bulbuls from the entire Indian Ocean region. Formerly, some authorities considered the Mauritius bulbul to belong to the genus Turdus. It has also been classified as a subspecies of the Réunion bulbul. Alternative names include the Mauritius black bulbul and the Mauritius merle.

Description
It is characterized by bright yellow-brown eyes, pink legs, and an orange to yellow-hued bill. Its plumage is generally greyish contrasted with a black crest. The plumage of the juveniles is pale brown. Their bill is blackish.

Behaviour and ecology

Breeding
During the southern summer, the female lays two pinkish coloured eggs in a nest made from straw and roots. The incubation lasts between 14 and 16 days.

Food and feeding
The diet of the Mauritius bulbul consists of insects, seeds, and fruits. The ripe berries of the non-native Spanish Flag are especially favoured.

Threats
In earlier times, it was often served as a dish on festive days. Later, its main threats shifted to the replacement of their forest habitat by tea plantations and invasive weeds (including L. camara, which the birds themselves help to spread) and predation by the introduced crab-eating macaque. In the mid-1970s, only 200 pairs remained, but then the decline was stopped. Today it is rare but has a quite stable population; 280 pairs were counted in 1993.

References

External links

 
 
 
 
 

Hypsipetes
Birds of Mauritius
Birds described in 1837
Taxa named by Sir William Jardine
Taxa named by Prideaux John Selby